Sun Belt Express is a 2014 American independent comedy-drama film, written by Evan Buxbaum, Chance Mullen, and Gregorio Castro, and directed by Evan Buxbaum.  Starring Tate Donovan, Rachael Harris, Ana de la Reguera, India Ennenga, Miguel Sandoval, and Stephen Lang, the project had its world premiere on June 11, 2014, at the Champs-Elysees Film Festival.

Plot
Former ethics Professor Allen King (Tate Donovan) has some problems. After being terminated for plagiarizing the work of a student, he hits a personal rock bottom.  To survive and get the cash he needs to cover his ex-wife Margaret's (Rachael Harris) expenses, he ends up shuttling illegal immigrants across the border and into Arizona from Mexico.  On his most recent trip, he is accompanied by his pregnant Mexican girlfriend Anna (Ana de la Reguera) and his teenage daughter Emily (India Ennenga). While still south of the US border  and with three undocumented immigrants supplied by human trafficker Ramon Velazquez (Miguel Sandoval) stuffed in the trunk of the car, the party crosses paths with crooked US Border Patrol officers Rick (Stephen Lang) and Cass (Michael Sirow).

Cast

 Tate Donovan as Allen King
 Rachael Harris as Margaret King
 Ana de la Reguera as Ana
 India Ennenga as Emily King
 Miguel Sandoval as Ramon Velazquez
 Stephen Lang as Border Patrol Officer Rick
 Oscar Avila as Rafi
 Michael Sirow as Border Patrol Officer Cass
 Robert Buxbaum as Pat
 Greg Eichman as Jack
 Mario Moreno as Julian
 Chance Mullen as Josh
 James Ning as Wei
 Lisa Radecki as Professor
 Emma E. Ramos as  Emma 
 Brenden Wedner as Jimmy
 Arturo Castro as Miguel
 Deborah Chavez as Miguel's Mother

Production
The project filmed for almost a month in 2012 at New Mexico locations in Belen, Los Lunas, Socorro and Albuquerque, with some financing obtained through crowdfunding campaigns at IndieGoGo and Kickstarter.  In July 2012, Indiewire listed the project as its "Project of the Day".

Release
The film had its world premiere on June 11, 2014 at the Champs-Elysees Film Festival. and its New Mexico premiere  October 18, 2014 at the Santa Fe Independent Film Festival.

Marvista Entertainment obtained United States and Latin American rights to distribute the film, which they have slated for a release through video on demand for on August 18, 2015.

Reception
The Hollywood Reporter praised the film and wrote it was "a rough-and-tumble but occasionally very funny indie comedy".

Awards and nomination
 2013, while in post-production received 'US In Progress' award at the American Film Festival in Wroclaw, Poland
 2014, Audience Award Nomination as 'Best American Feature Film' at Champs-Elysees Film Festival
 2014, Won 'The Grand Prix Award: Dramatic' at Chelsea Film Festival
 2015, Won 'Festival Award - Best Actor' for Tate Donovan at Chelsea Film Festival
 2015, Won 'Festival Award - Best Actress'for India Ennenga at Chelsea Film Festival
 2015, Won 'Festival Award - Best Supporting Actress' for Ana de la Reguera at Chelsea Film Festival
 2014, nominated for 'New Visions Award - Main Feature Film Award' at Bahamas International Film Festival
 2015, Won 'Outstanding Achievement in Filmmaking - Editing' for Beth Moran at Newport Beach Film Festival

References

External links
 
 
 

2014 films
2014 comedy-drama films
2010s English-language films
2010s Spanish-language films
2010s road comedy-drama films
American road comedy-drama films
American independent films
2014 independent films
2010s American films